Northern Plains Electric Cooperative is a public utility cooperative based in Carrington and Cando, North Dakota.  It serves as the electric distribution utility in a portion of east central North Dakota.  It receives power from the Central Power Electric Cooperative.

Northern Plains is the largest cooperative in ND land-wise and was created in 1997 from the merger of Baker Electric Cooperative (based in Cando, and which was the first REA-financed electric cooperative in the state) and Tri-County Electric Cooperative (which was established at Glenfield before relocating to Carrington). In 2005, Northern Plains entered into a resource-sharing agreement with its southern neighbor, Dakota Valley Rural Electric Cooperative, that allows them to function as one large cooperative while continuing as two separate companies.

External links
Official site

Electric cooperatives in North Dakota
Carrington, North Dakota
Electric power companies of the United States